The Topeka Metropolitan Statistical Area, as defined by the United States Census Bureau, is an area consisting of five counties in northeastern Kansas, anchored by the city of Topeka. In total, it has an area of 3,290.15 square miles. As of the 2010 census, the MSA had a population of 233,870 (though a July 1, 2012 estimate placed the population at 234,566).

Counties
Jackson
Jefferson
Osage
Shawnee
Wabaunsee

Communities

Places with more than 100,000 inhabitants
Topeka (Principal city)

Places with 1,000 to 5,000 inhabitants
Auburn
Carbondale
Holton
Lyndon
Osage City
Oskaloosa
Overbrook
Rossville
Silver Lake
Valley Falls

Places with 500 to 1,000 inhabitants
Alma
Burlingame
Eskridge
Hoyt
Maple Hill
McLouth
Meriden
Nortonville
Ozawkie
Perry
Scranton
Winchester

Places with less than 500 inhabitants
Alta Vista
Circleville
Delia
Denison
Harveyville
Mayetta
McFarland
Melvern
Olivet
Paxico
Quenemo
Soldier
Whiting
Willard

Unincorporated places
Berryton
Dover
Mooney Creek
Pauline
Tecumseh
Thompsonville
Wabaunsee

Demographics
As of the census of 2000, there were 224,551 people, 89,600 households, and 60,052 families residing within the MSA. The racial makeup of the MSA was 85.95% White, 6.95% African American, 1.41% Native American, 0.76% Asian, 0.04% Pacific Islander, 2.53% from other races, and 2.40% from two or more races. Hispanic or Latino of any race were 5.85% of the population.

The median income for a household in the MSA was $41,322, and the median income for a family was $48,124. Males had a median income of $33,251 versus $24,079 for females. The per capita income for the MSA was $18,856.

See also
Kansas census statistical areas

References

 
Shawnee County, Kansas
Jefferson County, Kansas
Jackson County, Kansas
Osage County, Kansas
Wabaunsee County, Kansas
Metropolitan areas of Kansas